The OpenDaylight Project is a collaborative open-source project hosted by the Linux Foundation. The project serves as a platform for software-defined networking (SDN) for open, centralized, computer network device monitoring.

History 
On April 8, 2013, The Linux Foundation announced the founding of the OpenDaylight Project. The goal was to create a community-led and industry-supported, open-source platform to accelerate adoption & innovation in terms of software-defined networking (SDN) and network functions virtualization (NFV).  The project's founding members were Big Switch Networks, Brocade, Cisco, Citrix, Ericsson, IBM, Juniper Networks, Microsoft, NEC, Red Hat and VMware.

Reaction to the goals of open architecture and administration by The Linux Foundation have been mostly positive. While initial criticism centered on concerns that this group could be used by incumbent technology vendors to stifle innovation, most of the companies signed up as members do not sell incumbent networking technology.

Technical steering committee 
For governance of the project, the technical steering committee (TSC) provides technical oversight over the project. The TSC is able to hold voting on major changes to the project. As of June 2022, the TSC includes:

 Anil Belur (The Linux Foundation)
 Cedric Ollivier (Orange)
 Guillaume Lambert (Orange)
 Ivan Hrasko (PANTHEON.tech)
 Luis Gomez (Kratos)
 Manoj Chokka (Verizon)
 Robert Varga (PANTHEON.tech)
 Venkatrangan Govindarajan (Rakuten Mobile)

Code Contributions 
By 2015, user companies began  participating in upstream development. The largest, actively contributing companies include PANTHEON.tech⁣, Orange, Red Hat, and Ericsson. At the time of the Carbon release in May 2017, the project estimated that over 1 billion subscribers accessing OpenDaylight-based networks, in addition to its usage within large enterprises.

There is a dedicated OpenDaylight Wiki, and mailing lists.

Technology

Projects 
The platform is described as a modular, open-source platform for automating networks. Part of the concept of modularity are over 50 projects, which address & extend the capabilities of networks managed by OpenDaylight. Each project has a formal structure, teams and meetings to discuss releases, functionality and code. Projects include BGPCEP, TransportPCE, NETCONF, YANG Tools, and others.

Releases 
Releases are named after the atomic number of chemical elements, including the corresponding number.

Members 
Originally there were three tiers of membership for OpenDaylight: Platinum, Gold and Silver, with varying levels of commitment.

As of January 2018, OpenDaylight became a project within the LF Networking Foundation, which consolidated membership across multiple projects into a common governance structure. Most OpenDaylight members became members of the new LF Networking Foundation.

See also 
 List of SDN controller software

References

External links 
 

Computer networking
Linux Foundation projects